Manuel Fernández Serrano (born 1964), better known as Manolo Solo, is a Spanish actor.

Biography 
Born in Algeciras in 1964, Manuel Fernández Serrano (his real name) was raised in neighbouring Los Barrios until age 6, later moving to Seville with his family. He earned a licentiate degree in Education Sciences from the University of Seville and trained his acting chops at the Seville's . After debuting on stage in 1989 and making a number of television appearances, he landed his feature film debut in the drama , released in 2002.

Selected filmography

Accolades

References

External links 

1964 births
Living people
Spanish male film actors
Best Supporting Actor Goya Award winners
21st-century Spanish male actors
Male actors from Andalusia